Aculco is a municipality located in the Atlacomulco Region of the State of Mexico in Mexico. The name comes from Nahuatl. The municipal seat is the town of Aculco de Espinoza, although both the town and municipality are commonly referred to as simply "San Jerónimo Aculco".

The municipality is 110 kilometers away from Mexico City, and is known for its artisans and cheeses, according to El Heraldo. Aculco currently has a population of over 44,823 inhabitants. The mayor or municipal president of Aculco is Jorge Alfredo Osnornio.

History
Aculco was founded approximately in 1110 AD by the Otomies, despite the fact that its name comes from Nahuatl. After being a village inhabited by Otomies for long time, it became a region dominated by the Mexicas, who lived there many years before the founding of Tenochtitlan.

With the arrival of the Spanish in 1540, construction on the church and the convent of San Jeronimo began. In November 1810, Miguel Hidalgo and his contingent, who began the Mexican War of Independence, arrived in the region. Aculco was also where insurgents, led by Don Miguel Hidalgo, lost a battle against the troops of Felix Ma. Calleja.

During the nineteenth century, the town hall and the first primary school in the region were constructed. Public baths and a municipal pool were also built.

On February 19, 1825, it became a municipality. In 1914 and 1915, Aculco was the scene of clashes led by the revolutionaries’ carrancistas, villistas and Zapatistas.

Geography

That represents 2.18% of Mexico State, of which it is a part of. Aculco borders Polotitlán in the north, Querétaro in the south, and Acambay and Timilpan in the south. It is approximately 100 kilometers away from or over 1 hour from Toluca, Toluca.

Climate
Aculco has a relatively cool, humid climate, with rain in the summer. The rain season starts at the end of March or beginning of April and lasts until October or November.

Flora and fauna 

There is a diversity in plants and animals of temperate climate and semi-arid climate (Mezquital Valley).

Native animals include: cacomistle, skunk, gopher, Virginia opossum, rabbit, Mexican gray squirrel, turkey, colibri, turkey vulture, northern mockingbird, rattlesnake, pine snake, black phoebe, rufous-crowned sparrow, great horned owl, axolotl, frog, toad, red ant, bee, and others.

Politics

Mayors
Sworn in to the role on December 13, 2018, Aculco Jorge Alfredo Osornio Victoria will remain president until 2021. He was previously a member of the Institutional Revolutionary Party.

Economy
The main economic activity of Aculco is the ranching of animals like pigs and sheep. The municipality's principal products include milk, fur, wool and egg. Aculco's inner commerce principally occurs at the municipal market, while its outer commerce is with Toluca, Mexico City and Querétaro.

Another major economic activity of Aculco is the exploitation of natural resources like sand, with quarries present in the region. The municipality is also home to a metal structure manufacturing company.

Aculco is famous for the dairy products it produces. In 2019, Aculco has about 60 artisan workshops for cheese and dairy production.

Tourism
Aculco contains a number of notable geographic features. Two cascades are located in the area: "Tixhiñu" and "la Concepción". Rivers including the Río Ñadó and Río Prieto also flow through the municipality.

Aculco is home to numerous historic sites, including the San Jerónimo and the "Garrido Varela" bullring, as well as the former residence of Miguel Hidalgo y Costilla. Two busts are located in Aculco in the memory of Benito Juarez and Miguel Hidalgo.

Demographics
According to INEGI, in 2005, Aculco has a population of over 40,000. The ethnic composition is mainly Otomi.

Over 16,000 people in the region are illiterate.

Communities belonging to the municipality

Other communities include:

Culture
The foundation of the Aculco municipality is celebrated on February 19. In March and April, the municipality holds a scenic performance of Semana Mayor that starts on Holy Thursday, in honor of Señor Nenthé. There is a festival to the Saint Patron Saint Jerome on September 30, including regional fairs, dances, and food.

Notable people

Fernando Altamirano (baptized 1848 in Aculco), physician, botanist and naturalist
Mauro Máximo de Jesús (born 1957 in Aculco), - athlete
Ignacio Espinoza Martínez
Lucas Magos Bárcenas y Cornejo  
Alfonso Díaz de la Vega
Pablo de San Antonio Indio
Juan García, Juan Nicolás
Sotero González Mena
Juan Maldonado Chemiso
José Rafael Polo
José Trinidad Polo
Manuel Polo

See also 
Camino Real de Tierra Adentro

References

External links